The Barking Spiders Live: 1983 is a live album by Australian rock band Cold Chisel. It was recorded during the final performances of their Last Stand tour in 1983, at the Sydney Entertainment Centre. The name of the album derives from a name the band used occasionally when playing warm-up shows before tours. Don Walker states a "barking spider" is "Scottish slang for a fart."

The album peaked at number 14 on the Australian Kent Music Report.

Reception
Reviewed in the Canberra Times at the time of release, the album was described as, "a great reminder of the band's power and talent, particularly in concert, and a crucial purchase for all Chisel fans."

Rip It Up said, "Many of the songs included here are distinct improvements on the studio versions, particularly "Taipan" and "Bow River", which have grown in stature and are complemented by some excellent harmonica courtesy of David Blight. Don't be deterred by the old school bootleg packaging."

Track listing
All tracks by Don Walker except where indicated

Side one
"Merry-Go-Round"
"You Got Nothing I Want" (Jimmy Barnes)
"No Sense" (Barnes)
"Hold Me Tight"
"Tomorrow"
"Forever Now" (Steve Prestwich)

Side two
"Standing on the Outside"
"Bow River" (Ian Moss)
"It's Only Make Believe" (Jack Nance, Conway Twitty)
"Twentieth Century"
"Taipan"
"Georgia" (Stuart Gorrell, Hoagy Carmichael)

Charts

Weekly Charts

Personnel
Jim Barnes - vocals, guitar
Ian Moss - guitar, lead vocals tracks 8 and 12
Don Walker - organ, piano
Phil Small - bass
Steve Prestwich - drums
Dave Blight - harmonica

Footnotes

Cold Chisel albums
1984 live albums
Albums produced by Mark Opitz